The Shadow (1940) was the ninth serial released by Columbia Pictures. It was based upon the classic radio series and pulp magazine superhero character of the same name.

Plot
The Shadow battles a villain known as The Black Tiger, who has the power to make himself invisible and is attempting domination of major financial and business concerns.

Victor Jory's Shadow is faithful to the radio character, especially the radio show's signature: the sinister chuckle of the invisible Shadow as he confronts the villain or his henchmen. Columbia, however, relied on fistfights, chases, and headlong action in its serials, and disliked the prospect of a 15-chapter adventure where the audience would not see much of the heroics, because the leading character was supposed to be invisible. By basing the serial more on the pulp fiction version and turning the mysterious Shadow into a flesh-and-blood figure, plainly visible wearing a black hat and black cloak, Columbia patterned the serial after its wildly successful serial, The Spider's Web (1938), itself based on a masked hero of pulp fiction. The Spider was the respectable Richard Wentworth, who terrorized the underworld as the mysterious Spider and infiltrated gangland under a third identity, small-time crook Blinky McQuade. Columbia copied the triple-role format for The Shadow, with the stalwart Lamont Cranston baffling criminals as The Shadow wearing a similar disguise and moving among them as their Asian confederate Lin Chang.

Chapter titles
The serial is split into fifteen episodes.Source:
 The Doomed City
 The Shadow Attacks
 The Shadow's Peril
 In the Tiger's Lair
 Danger Above
 The Shadow's Trap
 Where Horror Waits
 The Shadow Rides the Rails
 The Devil in White
 The Underground Trap
 Chinatown Night
 Murder by Remote Control
 Wheels of Death
 The Sealed Room
 The Shadow's Net Closes

Cast
 Victor Jory as Lamont Cranston - aka 'The Shadow'
 Veda Ann Borg as Margo Lane
 Roger Moore as Harry Vincent
 Robert Fiske as Stanford Marshall - aka 'The Black Tiger'
 J. Paul Jones as Mr. Turner
 Jack Ingram as Flint
 Chuck Hamilton as Roberts - Henchman 
 Edward Peil Sr. as Inspector Joe Cardona
 Frank LaRue as Commissioner Ralph Weston
 Harry Tenbrook (uncredited) as Adams

Release

Theatrical
The Shadow was released on 1 June 1940, Veda Ann Borg's 25th birthday.

Home media
In 1997, Columbia TriStar Home Video released the serial on VHS. In 2015, Mill Creek Entertainment released the serial on DVD under license from Sony Pictures Home Entertainment.

Critical reception
Opinion on the serial, especially as an adaptation on the pulp magazine source material, is mixed. Harmon and Glut are critical of the serial. Filming The Shadow in brightly lit environments undermines the mystery and menace of the character. The quality of the plotting is also brought into question for its lack of imagination and the fact that the hero appears to survive cliffhanger endings and other threats for no reason other than that he is the serial's masked hero.  On the other hand, Cline praises the serial. The mystery of the pulp magazine was preserved by both the hero and villain being masked. This lent an ambiguity from the point of view of the other characters that also pervaded the source material, so "for the audience the result was perfectly compatible and a pure delight".

See also
 List of film serials by year
 List of film serials by studio

References

External links
 
 
 Cinefania.com

The Shadow
1940 films
1940s superhero films
American black-and-white films
Columbia Pictures film serials
1940s English-language films
Films directed by James W. Horne
1940 adventure films
The Shadow films
American adventure films
Films with screenplays by Joseph F. Poland
1940s American films